Joaquín Oviedo (born 17 July 2001) is an Argentinian rugby union player, currently playing for Top 14 side Perpignan. His preferred position is flanker or Number 8.

Professional career
Oviedo represented  in the Súper Liga Americana de Rugby competition in 2021. He signed for  ahead of the 2021–22 Top 14 season. He was named in the Argentina squad for the 2021 Rugby Championship. He made his debut in Round 5 of the 2021 Rugby Championship against Australia.

References

External links

2001 births
Living people
Argentine rugby union players
Argentina international rugby union players
Rugby union flankers
Rugby union number eights
Jaguares (Super Rugby) players
USA Perpignan players